Carlos Alberto Arreola Rodríguez (born 4 March 1995) is a Mexican footballer who plays as a side-back and defensive midfielder for Ascenso MX squad Coras de Nayarit, on loan from Club Atlas de Guadalajara.

Club career

Atlas
Arreola started his career with Atlas on 2011, playing for filial teams on the second and third divisions.

On 20 February 2015, Arreola made his official debut with Atlas in an away game against Club Santos Laguna. He played 66 minutes as a right-back in a line of 4, in a match celebrated in the Estadio Corona which Atlas won 0–1.

Tampico Madero
On 8 June 2016, Tampico Madero signed Arreola on loan from Club Atlas.

U. de C.
In 2017, Arreola signed with Loros UdeC on loan from Atlas.

International career
Arreola was called up to the Mexican U18s in 2013. He later formed a part of the Mexico U20s team that participated in the 2015 FIFA U-20 World Cup.

References

External links
 Carlos Arreola at Liga MX
 

1995 births
Living people
Footballers from Jalisco
Liga MX players
Atlas F.C. footballers
Tampico Madero F.C. footballers
Association football defenders
People from Tala, Jalisco
Ascenso MX players
Liga Premier de México players
Tercera División de México players
Mexican footballers